The Yellow Ticket is a 1931 American feature film.

Yellow Ticket may also refer to:
 Yellow ticket, a prostitute ID card in Russian Empire
 The Yellow Ticket (1918 film), an American silent film
 The Yellow Ticket (1928 film), a Soviet silent drama film
 The Yellow Ticket (play), a 1914 play by Michael Morton

See also
 Der Gelbe Schein, a 1918 German silent film